Strontium sulfide is the inorganic compound with the formula SrS. It is a white solid.  The compound is an intermediate in the conversion of strontium sulfate, the main strontium ore called celestite (or, more correctly, celestine), to other more useful compounds.

Production and reactions
Strontium sulfide is produced by roasting celestine with coke at 1100–1300 °C. The sulfate is reduced, leaving the sulfide:
SrSO4  + 2 C   →   SrS  +  2 CO2
About 300,000 tons are processed in this way annually.  Both luminous and nonluminous sulfide phases are known, impurities, defects, and dopants being important.

As expected for a sulfide salt of alkaline earth, the sulfide hydrolyzes readily:
SrS  +  2 H2O →   Sr(OH)2  +  H2S
For this reason, samples of SrS have an odor of rotten eggs.

Similar reactions are used in the production of commercially useful compounds, including the most useful strontium compound, strontium carbonate: a mixture of strontium sulfide with either carbon dioxide gas or sodium carbonate leads to formation of a precipitate of strontium carbonate.
SrS  +  H2O  +  CO2 →   SrCO3  +  H2S
SrS  +  Na2CO3 →   SrCO3  +  Na2S
Strontium nitrate can also be prepared in this way.

References

External links
 Strontium Sulfide Info American Elements

Strontium compounds
Sulfides
Rock salt crystal structure